This is a list of women artists who were born in America or whose artworks are closely associated with that country. Included are recognized American women artists, known for creating artworks that are primarily visual in nature, in traditional media such as painting, sculpture, photography, printmaking, ceramics as well as in more recently developed genres, such as installation art, performance art, conceptual art, digital art and video art.

A
 Berenice Abbott (1898–1991), photographer
 Gertrude Abercrombie (1909–1977), Surrealist painter
 Marjorie Acker (1894–1985), painter
 Pat Adams (born 1928), painter
 Lillian Adelman  (1899 – 1985), printmaker
 Kathleen Gemberling Adkison (1917–2010), abstract expressionist painter
 Irma Aguayo, muralist
 Ellen Wetherald Ahrens (1859 – c.1937), illustrator,  miniature painter, stained glass artist
 Ariele Alasko, designer, woodworker 
 Grace Albee (1890–1985), printmaker
 Maxine Albro (1903–1966), painter, muralist, lithographer, mosaic artist, sculptor
 Mabel Alvarez (1891–1985), painter
 Jean Goodwin Ames (1903–1986), muralist, educator
 Laurie Anderson (born 1947), performance artist, musician
 Eleanor Antin (born 1935), performance artist, installation art
 Janine Antoni (born 1964), sculptor, installation artist
 Ida Applebroog (born 1929), painter, sculptor
 Mia Araujo, painter
 Diane Arbus (1923–1971), photographer
 Julie Ault (born 1957), collaborative artist, curator
 Lynne Avadenka, printmaker, book artist
 Alice Aycock (born 1946), sculptor
 Helene Aylon, (1931–2020), painter

B
 Carrie Ann Baade (born 1974), painter
 Alice Baber (1928–1982), painter
 Alexandra Backford (1942–2010), painter
 Lucy Bacon (1857–1932), painter
 Peggy Bacon (1895–1987), printmaker, painter, illustrator
 Gretchen Baer (born 1963), painter, performance artist
 Jo Baer (born 1929), painter
 Frances Bagley (born 1946), sculptor
 Margarete Bagshaw (1964–2015), painter, clay artist
 Jean Bales (1946–2004), painter, printmaker
 Rina Banerjee (born 1963), painter, sculptor
 Colette Bangert (born 1934), new media artist
 Hayley Barker (born 1973), painter
 Alice Pike Barney (1857–1931), painter
 Hannelore Baron (1926–1987), collage artist
 Jennifer Bartlett (born 1941), painter
 Ruth Henshaw Bascom (1772–1848), folk art portraitist
 Isabel Bate (1909 – 1995), muralist
 Jean Cory Beall, (1909–1978), painter
 Betty Beaumont (born 1946), site-specific artist
 Cecilia Beaux (1855–1942), painter
 Aisha Tandiwe Bell, mixed media artist
 Caroline M. Bell (1874–1970), painter
 Emilie Benes Brzezinski (born 1932), sculptor
 Lynda Benglis (born 1941), sculptor
 Debra Bermingham (born 1953), interior scenes and still lifes
 Becca Bernstein (born 1977), painter
 Judith Bernstein (born 1942), feminist artist
 Helen Bershad (born 1934), abstract expressionist painter
 Rachel Bess (born c. 1979), painter
 Isabel Bishop (1902–1988), painter, printmaker
 Nell Blaine (1922–1996), painter
 Lucile Blanch (1895–1981), painter
 Erlena Chisolm Bland (1923–2009), painter
 Marie Bleck (1911–1949), printmaker
 Gertrude Bleiberg (1921–2001), painter
 Rebecca Bluestone (born 1953), tapestry artist
 Meghan Boody (born 1964), surrealist artist
 Margaret Boozer (born 1966), ceramist
 Nancy Borowick (born 1985), photographer
 Dorr Bothwell (1902–2000), painter, printmaker
 Margo Consuela Bors (born 1942), mural painter
 Pauline Boumphrey (1886–1959), sculptor
 Louise Bourgeois (1911–2010), sculptor, printmaker
 Margaret Bourke-White (1904–1971), photographer
 Sandra Bowden (born 1943), painter
 Katherine Bowling (born 1955), landscape artist
 Lisa Bradley (born 1951), painter
 Gladys Ames Brannigan (1882–1944), painter, muralist 
 Dorothy Braudy, painter
 Sarah Brayer (born 1957), painter, paper artist, printmaker
 Cornelia Breitenbach (1948–1984), textile artist
 Karen Breschi (born 1941), ceramic artist
 Bessie Marsh Brewer (1884–1952), painter, printmaker
 Anna Richards Brewster (1870–1952), painter
 Allyn Bromley (born 1928), printmaker
 Leigh Brooklyn (born 1987), figurative artist
 Caroline Shawk Brooks (1840–1913), sculptor
 Romaine Brooks (1874–1970), painter
 Joan Brown (1938–1990), painter
 Laura Bruce (born 1959), artist
 Fran Bull (born 1938), painter, printmaker, sculptor, installation artist
 Barbara Burrage (1900–1989), printmaker
 Edith Woodman Burroughs (1871–1916), sculptor
 Lilian Thomas Burwell (born 1927), painter, sculptor
 Deborah Butterfield (born 1949), sculptor
 Kathy Butterly (born 1963), sculptor 
 Charlot Byj (1920–1983), greeting card artist
 Charlie Bynar, (born 1966), watercolor painter

C
 Victoria Cabezas (born 1950), conceptual artist, photographer
 Nancy Calef, contemporary figure painter
 Sheila Cameron, contemporary graphic designer
 Floy Campbell (1873–1945), painter
 Pauline Campanelli (1943–2001), painter, writer
 Cristina Cardenas (born 1957), painter, printmaker
 Kate Carew (1869–1961), caricaturist
 Rhea Carmi (born 1942), abstract expressionist
 Virginia Cartwright (born 1943), ceramic artist
 Mary Cassatt (1844–1926), painter, printmaker
 Eda Nemoede Casterton (1877–1969), painter
 Rosemarie Castoro (1939–2015), painter, sculptor
 Elizabeth Catlett (1915–2012), sculptor, printmaker
 Vija Celmins (born 1938), painter, graphic artist, printmaker
 Aleah Chapin (born 1986), portrait painter
 Sarah Charlesworth (1947–2013), conceptual artist, photographer
 Louisa Chase (1951–2016), painter
 Judy Chicago (born 1939), installation artist, sculptor
 Marie Z. Chino (1907–1982), potter, ceramic artist
 Chryssa (1933–2013), sculptor
 Anne Chu (1959–2016), sculptor
 Alson S. Clark (1876–1949), painter
 Grace Clements (1905–1969), muralist, mosaic artist
 Caroline Morgan Clowes (1838–1904), painter
 Cora Cohen (born 1943), painter
 Hannah Cohoon (1788–1864), painter
 Max Colby (born 1990), textiles, installation artist
 Bethany Collins (born 1984), book artist
 Ethel Blanchard Collver (1875–1955), impressionist painter
 Gladys Emerson Cook (1899-1976), painter, illustrator
 Austine Wood Comarow (1942–2020), light artist
 Alice Cooper (1875–1937), sculptor
 Annette Corcoran (born 1930), graphic artist, ceramist
 Sue Jean Covacevich (1905-1998), painter 
 Susanne Crane (born 1966), painter 
 Susan Crile (born 1942), painter
 Imogen Cunningham (1883–1976), photographer
 Marian Curtis (1882–1944), painter

D
 Fra M. Dana (1874–1948), painter
 Jo Davidson (1883–1952), sculptor
 Eleanor Layfield Davis (1911–1985), painter, sculptor
 Helena Smith Dayton (1879–1960), painter, sculptor
 Rosetta DeBerardinis, contemporary painter
 Pat DeCaro (born 1951), painter
 Angel De Cora (1871–1919), painter, illustrator
 Mathilde De Cordoba (1882 – 1944), printmaker
 Virginia Dehn (1922–2005), painter, printmaker
 Dorothy Dehner (1901–1994), sculptor, printmaker
 Perla de Leon (born 1952), photographer
 Jenny Eakin Delony (1866–1949), painter
 Elizabeth Demaray, sculptor 
 Maya Deren (1917–1961), avant-garde filmmaker and theorist, photographer
 Mamie Deschillie (1920-2010), folk artist 
 Lillian Desow-Fishbein (1921–2004), painter
 Heather Dewey-Hagborg (born 1982), information art, bio-hacker
 Lesley Dill (born 1950), multi-media artist
 Margaret Dillard, contemporary painter
 Francesca DiMattio (born 1981), painter, sculptor
 Edith Dimock (1876–1955), painter
 Eulabee Dix (1878–1961), miniatures painter
 Michele Oka Doner (born 1945), sculptor, printmaker, video artist
 Seena Donneson (1924–2020), sculptor
 Bailey Doogan (born 1941), painter
 Helen Thomas Dranga (1866–1940), painter
 Katherine S. Dreier (1877–1952), painter
 Rosalyn Drexler (born 1926), painter
 Elsie Driggs (1898–1992), painter

E
 Margaret Fernie Eaton (1871–?), book plate illustrator
 Abastenia St. Leger Eberle (1878–1942), sculptor
 Sheila Elias (born 1945), installation artist
 Mary Endico (born 1954), watercolor painter
 Nita Engle (1925–2019), painter
 Janeil Engelstad, contemporary artist, curator
 Marisol Escobar (1930–2016), sculptor, printmaker
 Inka Essenhigh (born 1969), painter
 Dulah Marie Evans (1875–1951), painter, illustrator, printmaker, photographer, etcher
 Lin Evola (born 1950), sculptor

F
 Claire Falkenstein (1908–1997), sculptor
 Cornelia Adele Strong Fassett (1831–1898), portrait painter
 Sonya Fe (born 1952), painter
 Jo Feiler (born 1951), photographer
 Mildred Feinberg (1899–1990), painter
 Lauren Fensterstock (born 1975), installation artist, sculptor, goldsmith 
 Lillian Prest Ferguson (1867–1955), Canadian-born painter 
 Jackie Ferrara (born 1929), sculptor
 Carole Feuerman (born 1945), sculptor
 Perle Fine (1905–1988), abstract painter
 Janet Fish (born 1938), painter
 Audrey Flack (born 1931), painter
 Hertha E. Flack (1916–2019), painter, philanthropist
 Lola Flash (born 1959), photographer
 Enid Foster (1895–1979), sculptor, performance artist
 Constance Edith Fowler (1907–1996), painter, printmaker
 Helen Frank (born 1930), painter, printmaker
 Jane Frank (1918–1986), painter
 Helen Frankenthaler (1928–2011), painter, printmaker
 Andrea Fraser (born 1965), performance artist
 Laura Gardin Fraser (1889–1966), sculptor
 Susie Frazier (born 1970), mixed media artist
 Helen C. Frederick (born 1945), printmaker
 Jane Freilicher (1924–2014), painter
 Edith Frohock (1917–1997), painter, printmaker
 Wilhelmina Weber Furlong (1878–1962), painter

G
 Wanda Gág (1893–1946), printmaker, illustrator
 Ellen Gallagher (born 1965), painter, mixed media artist
 Jacalyn Lopez Garcia (born 1953), multimedia artist
 Elizabeth Jane Gardner (1837–1922), painter
 Sonia Gechtoff (1926–2018), painter 
 Mary Gehr (1913–1997), painter, printmaker
 Nellie Huntington Gere (1868–1949), painter, illustrator
 Sybil Gibson (1908–1995), painter
 Ruth Gikow (1915–1982), muralist
 Helen Gilbert (1922–2002), painter, kinetic sculptor
 Charlotte Gilbertson (1922–2014), painter, printmaker
 Margarete Garvin Gillin (1833–1915), painter
 Jane Emmet de Glehn (1873–1961), painter
 Judith Godwin (1930–2021), painter
 Leah Golberstein, contemporary installation artist
 Margery E. Goldberg (born 1950), painter, sculptor
 Sarah Beth Goncarova (born 1980), painter, sculptor, installation artist
 Elizabeth Goodridge (1798–1882), miniatures painter
 Sarah Goodridge (1788–1853), miniatures painter
 Lori K. Gordon (born 1958), multi-media artist 
 April Gornik (born 1953), painter
 Nancy Graves (1939–1995), sculptor, painter, printmaker
 Dorothy Grebenak (1913–1990), pop art, textile artist
 Elizabeth Shippen Green (1871–1954), illustrator
 Glenda Green (born 1945), painter
 Mary Sheppard Greene (1869–1958), painter, illustrator
 Lucila Villaseñor Grijalva, muralist
 Mimi Gross (born 1940), painter
 Jolán Gross-Bettelheim (1900–1972), printmaker 
 Hilda Grossman Morris (1911–1991), sculptor
 MK Guth (born 1963), installation artist

H
 Hildegarde Haas (1926–2002),  painter
 Carol Haerer (1933–2002), painter
 Lauren Halsey (born 1987), installation artist
 Elaine Hamilton-O'Neal (1920–2010), painter
 Helen Hardin (1943–1984), painter
 Tracy Harris (born 1958), painter
 Jan Harrison (born 1944), painter, sculptor
 Rachel Harrison (born 1966), sculptor, photographer
 Grace Hartigan (1922–2008), painter
 Jann Haworth (born 1942), sculptor
 Mary Heebner (born 1951), painter
 Carolyn Heller (1937–2011), painter, decorative artist
 Nestor Hernández (1961–2006), photographer
 Eva Hesse (1936–1970), sculptor
 Cornelia Ellis Hildebrandt (1876–1962), miniature painter
 Claude Raguet Hirst (1855–1942), trompe-l'œil painter, woodworker
 Beth Van Hoesen (1926–2010), printmaker
 Camille Hoffman (born 1987), installation artist
 Nancy Holt (1938–2014), sculptor, installation artist
 Jenny Holzer (born 1950), conceptual artist
 Edna Boies Hopkins (1872–1937), woodblock printer
 Violet Hopkins (born 1973), painter
 Naomi Louise Sunderland Hosterman (1903–1990), painter
 Letitia Huckaby (born 1972), photographer, mixed media
 Winnifred Hudson (1905–1996), abstract painter
 Anita Huffington (born 1934), sculptor
 Regina Olson Hughes (1895–1993), botanical illustrator
 Anna Hyatt Huntington (1876–1973), sculptor
 Luchita Hurtado (1920–2020), painter
 Alice Clary Earle Hyde (1876-1943), botanical artist

J
 Wendy W. Jacob (born 1958), sculptor
 Lotte Jacobi (1896–1990), photographer
 Laura Ann Jacobs (born 1960), sculptor, mixed media artist
 Yvonne Jacquette (born 1934), painter, printmaker
 Shirley Jaffe (1923–2016), painter
 Terrell James (born 1955), painter, sculptor
 Angela Jansen (born 1929), painter, sculptor
 Annette P. Jimerson (born 1966), painter
 Cathy Josefowitz (1956–2014), painter
 Joni T. Johnson (1934–1988), painter
 Martina Johnson-Allen (born 1947), painter, sculptor, and printmaker, educator
 Ida E. Jones, painter
 Joan Jonas (born 1936), video, performance artist, other media
 Lois Mailou Jones (1905–1998), painter
 Lorna Jordan (1954–2021), environmental artist
 Joanne Julian, contemporary mixed media artist

K
 Susan Kaprov (born 1946), multi-disciplinary artist
 Gertrude Käsebier (1852–1934), photographer
 Lila Katzen (1925–1998), sculptor
 Betty Keener Archuleta (1928–1998), painter
 Alice De Wolf Kellogg (1862–1900), painter
 Mary Kelly (born 1941), conceptual artist
 Greta Kempton (1901–1991), portrait painter
 Catherine Kernan (born 1948), painter
 Sandy Kessler Kaminski (born 1969), painter, mixed-media artist
 Ilah Marian Kibbey (1883–1957), genre and landscape painter
 Karen Kilimnik (born 1955), painter, installation artist
 Dorothy Stratton King (1909–2007), painter, printmaker
 Emma B. King (1857–1933), impressionist
 MaPo Kinnord (born 1960), ceramic artist, sculptor
 Sam Kirk (born 1981), street artist, muralist
 Mary Kirkwood (1904–1995), portrait painter, muralist
 Marilyn Kirsch (born 1950), painter
 Minnie Klavans (1915-1999), painter
 Fay Kleinman (1912–2012), painter
 Hedy Klineman, contemporary portrait painter
 Anna Elizabeth Klumpke (1856–1942), painter
 Gwendolyn Knight (1914–2005), painter
 Cynthia Knott (born 1952), seascape painter
 Alison Knowles (born 1933), Fluxus performance artist, printmaker
 Florence Koehler (1861–1944), designer, jeweler
 Ida Kohlmeyer (1912–1997), painter, sculptor
 Elaine de Kooning (1918–1989), painter
 Marni Kotak (born 1974), performance artist
 Margia Kramer (born 1939), mixed-media artist
 Lee Krasner (1908–1984), painter
 LaVerne Krause (1924–1987), printmaker, painter
 Barbara Kruger (born 1945), photographer, graphic artist, sculptor

L
 Rachel Lachowicz (born 1964), painter
 Suzanne Lacy (born 1945), installations, video, performance artist
 Anna Coleman Ladd (1878–1939), sculptor
 Millie Rose Lalk (1895–1943), painter
 Rosy Lamb (born 1973), painter, sculptor
 Dorothea Lange (1895–1965), photographer 
 Ellen Lanyon (1926–2013), painter
 Barbara Latham (1896–1989), painter, printmaker, illustrator
 Louise Lawler (born 1947), photographer
 Nancy Lawton (1950–2007), silver point artist
 Mary Le Ravin (1905–1992), multimedia artist
 Doris Lee (1905–1983), painter
 Zoe Leonard (born 1961), photographer, visual artist
 Sherrie Levine (born 1947), conceptual artist
 Fran Lew (born 1946), painter
 Ann Lewis (born 1981)
 Edmonia Lewis (1845–1911), sculptor
 Maya Lin (born 1959), installation artist
 Pat Lipsky (born 1941), painter
 Llanakila, contemporary painter, digital artist
 Lucile Lloyd (1894–1941), muralist
 Judith Lodge (born 1941), painter, photographer
 Zoe Longfield (1924–2013), abstract expressionist artist
 Angela Lorenz (born 1965), book artist
 Helen Lundeberg (1908–1999), painter
 Genevieve Springston Lynch (1891–1960), painter

M
 Cornelia MacIntyre Foley (1909–2010), painter
 Florence MacKubin (1857–1918), portrait painter
 Ethel Magafan (1916–1993), painter
 Claire Mahl Moore (1917–1988), printmaker
 Silvia Malagrino (born 1950), multimedia artist, filmmaker
 Maxine Martell (born 1937)
 Agnes Martin (1912–2004), painter
 Louise Martin (1911-1995), photographer
 Maria Martinez (1887–1980), potter, ceramist
 Soraida Martinez (born 1956), painter
 Emily Mason (1932–2019), painter
 Mercedes Matter (1913–2001), painter
 Amanda Matthews (born 1968), sculptor, painter, public art designer
 Louisa Matthíasdóttir (1917–2000), painter
 Randi Matushevitz (born 1965), painter
 Cornelia F. Maury (1866–1942), portrait painter
 Brookie Maxwell (1956–2015), artist, curator
 Nell Brooker Mayhew (1875–1940), painter
 Paula McCartney (born 1971), photographic works
 Renee McGinnis (born 1962), painter
 Sarah McKenzie (born 1971), painter
 Alexa Meade (born 1986), body artist
 Nellie Meadows (1915–2006), artist
 Donna Meistrich (born 1954), painter, sculptor, animator
 Dalila Paola Méndez (born 1975), painter
 Ana Mendieta (1948–1985), performance artist
 Nora Chapa Mendoza (born 1932), abstract painter
 Adah Isaacs Menken (1835–1868), actress, painter, poet
 Geneva Mercer (1889–1984), sculptor
 Betty Merken, painter, printmaker, abstract geometric monotypes
 Katherine Merrill (1876–1962), painter
 Deborah Mesa-Pelly (born 1968), painter
 Anne Michalov (1904–2001), printmaker
 Frances Myers, printmaker
 Eleanore Mikus (1927–2017), painter
 Melissa Miller (born 1951), painter
 Joan Mitchell (1925–1992), painter, printmaker
 Edna Zyl Modie (1886–1981), painter
 Charlotte Moorman (1933–1991), Fluxus, performance artist
 Rebecca Jo Morales (born 1962), painter
 Dorothy Morang (1906–1994), painter
 Ree Morton (1933–1977), painter, sculptor
 Jill Moser (born 1956), painter
 Grandma Moses (1860–1961), painter
 Ruth Mountaingrove (1923–2016), photographer, poet
 Brenna Murphy (born 1986), psychedelic art
 Elizabeth Murray (1940–2007), painter, printmaker
 Grace H. Murray (1872–1944), watercolor painter 
 Laura Myntti (born 1962), painter
 Caroline Mytinger (1897–1980), painter

N
 Elva Nampeyo (1926–1985), potter, ceramic artist 
 Fannie Nampeyo (1900–1987), potter, ceramic artist
 Iris Nampeyo (c. 1860–1942), potter, ceramic artist
 Inez Nathaniel-Walker (1911-1990), artist
 Alice Neel (1900–1984), painter
 Anne Neely (born 1946), painter
 Deborah Nehmad (born 1952), printmaker, mixed-media artist
 Pamela Nelson, contemporary painter, installation artist
 Hương Ngô (born 1979), installation artist, conceptual artist
 Abigail May Alcott Nieriker (1840–1879), artist
 Gladys Nilsson (born 1940), painter
 Ann Nooney (1900-1964), printmaker
 Tameka Norris (born 1979), performance artist
 Kenda North (born 1951), photographer

O
 Violet Oakley (1874–1961), muralist
 Linda Obermoeller (1941–1990), portrait painter
 Noni Olabisi (1954–2022), painter and muralist
 Mina Fonda Ochtman (1862–1924), painter
 Georgia O'Keeffe (1887–1986), painter
 Rose O'Neill (1874–1944), comic strip artist
 Catherine Opie (born 1961), photographer
 Sono Osato (born 1960), artist

P
 Linda Pace (1945–2007) contemporary, metal artists
 Josephine Paddock (1885–1964), painter
 Bashka Paeff (1894–1979), sculptor
 Susanna Paine (1792–1862), portrait painter
 Louise Parks (born 1945), painter
 Irene E. Parmelee (1847–1934), portrait painter
 Dellamarie Parrilli (born 1949), abstract expressionist, action painter
 Clara Weaver Parrish (1861–1925), painter, printmaker, stained glass designer
 Betty Parsons (1900–1982), painter, gallerist
 Eunice Parsons (born 1916),  modernist collagist
 Pat Passlof (1928–2011), painter 
 Christina Patoski (born 1948), photographer, video artist
 Ruthe Katherine Pearlman (1913–2007), painter, art educator
 Leemour Pelli (born 1964). painter
 Agnes Lawrence Pelton (1881–1961), modernist painter
 Beverly Pepper (1924–2020), sculptor, painter
 Isabelle Clark Percy West (1882–1976), designer
 I. Rice Pereira (1902–1971), abstract painter
 Lilla Cabot Perry (1848–1933), painter
 Elizabeth Peyton (born 1965), painter
 Nan Phelps (1904–1990), painter
 Mary Pillsbury Weston (1817-1895), painter
 Eunice Pinney (1770–1849), watercolor painter
 Adrian Piper (born 1948), conceptual artist
 Vanessa Platacis (born 1973), painter and installation artist
 Alethea Hill Platt (1860–1932), painter
 Gloria Plevin (born 1934), painter
 Stephanie Pogue (1944–2002), printmaker
 Susan Mohl Powers (born 1944), sculptor, painter
 Mary Elizabeth Price (1877–1965), painter
 Ann Purcell (born 1941), painter

Q
 Dextra Quotskuyva (born 1928), potter, ceramic artist

R
 Raquel Rabinovich (born 1929), painter, sculptor
 Yvonne Rainer (born 1934), performance artist, choreographer, dancer
 Chitra Ramanathan (born 1955), abstract painter, art educator
 Sophy Regensburg (1885–1974), naïve painter
 Deborah Remington (1930–2010), painter, printmaker
 Hilla Rebay (1890–1967), painter
 Christie Repasy (born 1958), floral painter
 Jessie Beard Rickly (1895-1975), painter
 Linda Ridgway (born 1947), sculptor
 Judy Rifka (born 1945), painter, video artist
 Erin M. Riley (born 1985), weaver, tapestry artist
 Faith Ringgold (born 1930), painter, fabric artist
 Anne Louise Gregory Ritter (1868–1929), painter, ceramicist
 Deborah Roberts (born 1962), painter
 Adelaide Alsop Robineau (1865–1929), painter, potter
 Dorothea Rockburne (born 1932), painter
 Anita Rodriguez (born 1941), painter
 Julia Rommel (born 1980), abstract painter
 Stephanie Rond (born 1973), painter
 Louise Emerson Ronnebeck (1901–1980), painter
 Christine Rosamond (1947–1994), painter
 Esther Rose (1901–1990), painter, calligrapher
 Martha Rosler (born 1943), video, photo-text, installation, performance art
 Barbara Rossi (born 1940), painter
 Susan Rothenberg (1945–2020), painter, printmaker
 Suze Rotolo (1943–2011), book artist, illustrator
 Brie Ruais (born 1982), multi-media artist
 Meridel Rubenstein (born 1948), photographer, installation artist
 Katie Ruiz (born 1984), painter
 Rosa Rush (1905 – 1971), printmaker

S
 Alison Saar (born 1956), sculptor, installation artist
 Betye Saar (born 1926), assemblage artist
 Betty Sabo (1928–2016), landscape painter, sculptor
 Kay Sage (1898–1963), painter
 Anna M. Sands (1860–1927/1940), painter
 Augusta Savage (1892–1962), sculptor
 Anne Savedge, contemporary photographer
 Joanna E. Schanz, basket weaver
 Kerri Scharlin, painter and conceptual artist
 Lonny Schiff (born 1929), collage artist
 Rachel Schmeidler, multi-media artist
 Carolee Schneemann (1939–2019), performance artist
 Joan Schulze (born 1936), textile artist
 Donna N. Schuster (1883–1953), painter
 Ethel Schwabacher (1903–1984), painter
 Barbara Schwartz (1949–2006), painter, sculptor
 Lillian Schwartz (born 1927), digital artist
 Janet Scudder (1869–1940), sculptor
 Bernarda Bryson Shahn (1903–2004), painter, lithographer
 Ann Leda Shapiro (born 1946), painter
 Honoré Desmond Sharrer (1920–2009), painter
 Susan Louise Shatter (1943–2011), landscape painter
 Ruth Faison Shaw (1888–1969), painter
 Judith Shea (born 1948), sculptor
 Mary Michael Shelley (born 1950), carver, painter
 Kara Shepherd (born 1911), surrealist painter
 Cindy Sherman (born 1954), photographer
 Sandra Sider (born 1946), quilt artist, curator
 Lauren Silva (born 1987), painter
 Laurie Simmons (born 1949), photographer
 Lorna Simpson (born 1960), photographer
 Schandra Singh (born 1977), painter
 Sylvia Sleigh (1916–2010), painter
 Jaune Quick-To-See Smith (born 1940), painter, printmaker
 Jessie Willcox Smith (1863–1935), illustrator
 Kiki Smith (born 1954), sculptor, printmaker, multi-media
 Amanda Snyder (1894–1980), painter, printmaker
 Joan Snyder (born 1940), painter
 Judith Solodkin (born 1945), printmaker
 Malia Solomon (1915–2005), textile artist
 Kathleen Mary Spagnolo (1919–2016), painter
 Elizabeth Sparhawk-Jones (1885–1968), painter
 Meredyth Sparks (born 1972), multimedia artist
 Nancy Spero (1926–2009), painter, printmaker, collage artist
 Betty Spindler (born 1943), ceramist
 Laura Splan (born 1973), multimedia artist
 Molly Springfield (born 1977), drawer
 Sharon Sprung (fl 2000s), visual artist
 Linda St. Clair (born 1952), wildlife painter
 Wendy Red Star (born 1981), multimedia artist
 Anita Steckel (1930–2012), graphic artist
 Marsha Steinberg (born 1946), painter, etcher
 Monika Steiner (born 1972), sculptor
 Bettina Steinke (1913–1999), painter, muralist
 Pat Steir (born 1940), painter
 Hedda Sterne (1910–2011), painter
 Florine Stettheimer (1871–1944), painter, set designer
 Beulah Stevenson (1890–1965), painter
 Lizbeth Stewart (1948–2013), ceramist
 Elena Stonaker (born 1985), textile artist
 Georgianna Stout (born 1967), graphic designer
 Renee Stout (born 1958), sculptor
 Marjorie Strider (1931–2014), sculptor
 Jane Stuart (1812–1888), portrait painter
 Michelle Stuart (born 1933), painter, sculptor, photographer
 Altoon Sultan (born 1948), painter
 Carol Sutton (born 1945), painter
 Liza Sylvestre, visual artist

T
 Anne Tabachnick (1927–1995), painter
 Dorothea Tanning (1910–2012), painter, surrealist
 Fay Morgan Taylor (1909–1990), modernist artist
 Juliet Thompson (1873–1956), painter
 Hannah Tompkins (1920–1995), painter, printmaker
 Selina Trieff (1934–2015), abstract artist
 Virginia True (1900–1989), painter
 Anne Truitt (1921–2004), sculptor
 Wu Tsang (born 1982), filmmaker, performance artist
 Diane Tuckman (born 1939), silk painter
 Mym Tuma (born 1940), painter, mixed media
 Ruth Tunstall Grant (1945–2017), painter
 Lynne Woods Turner (born 1951), abstract painter
 Vadis Turner (born 1977), mixed media, textile artist
 MJ Tyson (born 1986), jewelry designer

U
 Ruth Pershing Uhler (1895–1967), painter, curator
 Mierle Laderman Ukeles (born 1939), installation artist
 Doris Ulmann (1882–1934), photographer
 Audrey Ushenko (born 1945), figurative painter

V
 Aramenta Dianthe Vail (1820–1888), miniatures painter
 Clover Vail (born 1939), print-maker
 Jessie Rose Vala (born 1977), installation artist
 Lesley Vance (born 1977), painter
 Bessie Potter Vonnoh (1872–1955), sculptor

W
 Marion Wachtel (1875–1951), painter
 Stacy Lynn Waddell (born 1966), painter
 Carol Wald (1935–2000), illustrator
 Kara Walker (born 1969), painter, printmaker, installation artist
 Kay WalkingStick (born 1935), painter
 Mildred Waltrip (1911–2004), illustrator
 Nina B. Ward (1885–1944), painter
 Nina de Creeft Ward (1933), sculptor 
 Carol Wax (born 1953), printmaker
 Andrea Way (born 1949), painter, sculptor
 Stacey Lee Webber (born 1982), metalsmith
 Mary Hortense Webster (1881-1965), sculptor
 Carrie Mae Weems (born 1953), photographer
 Susan Weil (born 1930), painter
 Clara Barck Welles (1869–1965), silversmith
 Jean Wells (born 1949), mosaic sculptor
 Bessie Wheeler (born 1876), painter
 Candace Wheeler (1827–1923), interior and textile designer
 Karen Wheeler (born 1955), painter
 Lindsey White (born 1980), multi-media artist
 Emmi Whitehorse (born 1957), painter
 Elizabeth Whiteley (born 1945), multi-media artist 
 Gertrude Vanderbilt Whitney (1875–1942), sculptor
 Charmion Von Wiegand (1896–1983), painter
 Harriet "Hattie" Elizabeth Wilcox (1869–1943), ceramics artist
 Hannah Wilke (1940–1993), multi-media artist
 Mary Rogers Williams (1857–1907), painter
 Edwina Florence Wills (1915–2002), sculptor
 Cordelia Wilson (1873–1953), painter
 Jane Wilson (1924–2015), painter
 Mary Ann Wilson (fl. 1810–1825), watercolor painter
 Jacqueline Winsor (born 1941), sculptor
 Leona Wood (1921–2008), painter
 Thelma Wood (1901–1970), silverpoint artist
 Francesca Woodman (1958–1981), photographer
 Anna Woodward (1868–1935), painter
 Amy Namowitz Worthen (born 1946), printmaker, engraver
 Antonia Wright (artist) (born 1979), multi-media artist
 Patience Wright (1725–1786), sculptor
 Henriette Wyeth (1907–1997), painter

Y
 Enid Yandell (1870–1934), sculptor
 Mary Agnes Yerkes (1886–1989), painter
 Daisy Youngblood (born 1945), ceramic artist, sculptor
 Judy Youngblood (born 1948, painter
 Marlene Tseng Yu (born 1937), abstract painter
 Lisa Yuskavage (born 1962), painter

Z
 Bhakti Ziek (born 1946), textile artist
 Andrea Zittel (born 1965), sculptor, installation artist
 Marguerite Zorach (1887–1968), painter, textile artist

References

-
American women artists, List of
Artists, List of American women
Women